Salgareda is a comune (municipality) in the Province of Treviso in the Italian region Veneto, located about  northeast of Venice and about  east of Treviso.

The municipality of Salgareda contains the frazioni (subdivisions, mainly villages and hamlets) Campodipietra, Campobernardo, and Arzeri e Candolè (solo località riconosciute).

Salgareda borders the following municipalities: Cessalto, Chiarano, Noventa di Piave, San Biagio di Callalta, San Donà di Piave, Ponte di Piave, Zenson di Piave.

Demographic evolution

Twin towns
Salgareda is twinned with:

  Saint-Alban, Haute-Garonne, France, since 1989
  Brzeziny, Poland, since 2010

References

Cities and towns in Veneto